Al-Shaafah is a Syrian town located in Abu Kamal District, Deir ez-Zor.  According to the Syria Central Bureau of Statistics (CBS), Al-Shaafah had a population of 18,956 in the 2004 census.

The town was part of the last strip of land in Syria controlled by the Islamic State of Iraq and the Levant (ISIL). On 6 January 2019, the town was fully captured by SDF.

References 

Populated places in Deir ez-Zor Governorate
Populated places on the Euphrates River